Jan Willem Lotz  (26 August 1910 – 13 August 1986) was a South African rugby union player.

Playing career
During 1937 and 1938 he played in all 8 test matches played by the Springboks and was a member of the 1937 Springbok touring team to Australia and New Zealand, which won the test series against both countries. He played his last test match against the British Isles on 10 September 1938 at Newlands in Cape Town.

Test history

See also
List of South Africa national rugby union players – Springbok no. 255

References

1910 births
1986 deaths
South African rugby union players
South Africa international rugby union players
People from Krugersdorp
Rugby union players from Gauteng
Rugby union hookers
Golden Lions players